Pennsylvania's 18th congressional district was a district including the city of Pittsburgh and parts of surrounding suburbs. A variety of working class and majority black suburbs located to the east of the city were included, such as McKeesport and Wilkinsburg. Also a major part of the district was a number of middle class suburbs that have historic Democratic roots, such as Pleasant Hills and Penn Hills. The district became obsolete following the 2020 United States census. It was largely replaced by Pennsylvania's 12th congressional district.

The district covered much of the area that was the center of the Whiskey Rebellion of the 1790s.

History

Pre-2018 boundaries 
In February 2018, the Supreme Court of Pennsylvania ruled that the district map violated the state constitution due to gerrymandering and redrew all of the state's congressional districts. The 18th and 14th districts swapped numbers and had their boundaries adjusted for the 2018 elections (after March's special election) and thereafter.

Before the court-ordered redistricting in February 2018, the district was concentrated in the southern suburbs of Pittsburgh. It was predominantly white, although it contained a diverse range of suburbs. It was drawn in such a way that in some locations, neighborhoods and even streets were split between the 18th and the neighboring 12th and 14th districts. In parts of the eastern portion of the district, one side of the street was in the 12th while the other side was in the 18th. In the west, one side of the street was in the 14th while the other side was in the 18th.

Although there were 35,000 more Democrats in the district than Republicans in 2018, the district had been trending increasingly Republican since the mid-1990s; most of the district's state legislators were Republicans. The district was home to many large coal mines and the energy industry was an important employer. The western part of the district contained some rural regions of Washington County, as well as the very wealthy suburbs in the northern part of that county, which tends to be more Republican than the part contained in the neighboring 9th District. The district also contained many of Allegheny County's southern suburbs of Pittsburgh, which ranged from traditionally wealthy areas such as Upper St. Clair to middle-class communities such as Bethel Park and working-class labor towns such as Elizabeth.

The district skewed older and had the second-oldest electorate in the state in 2017.

The district wound along the eastern suburbs at the edge of Allegheny County, including most of the large suburban commercial center of Monroeville, and in western Westmoreland County. Central Westmoreland County, including the city of Greensburg, was also part of the district. It also contained the rural foothills of the county at the district's eastern end. Westmoreland County has become a major Republican stronghold.

Voter registration

Future 
The district became obsolete following the 2020 United States census. It was largely replaced by Pennsylvania's 12th congressional district, while some suburbs of Pittsburgh, such as Wilkinsburg, were redrawn into the 17th district.

List of members representing the district

Recent election results

2012

2014

2016

2018 special election

2018

2020

See also 
List of United States congressional districts
Pennsylvania's congressional districts

Notes

References

External links 
 Congressional redistricting in Pennsylvania

18
Constituencies established in 1823
1823 establishments in Pennsylvania
Constituencies disestablished in 2023
2023 disestablishments in Pennsylvania
Rick Santorum